Boston University Brussels, officially named the Boston University Brussels Graduate Center, and also known as BUB, was part of Boston University's Metropolitan College (MET), one of seventeen degree-granting colleges that make up Boston University. In 1972 Boston University became the first major American university to offer graduate business management degrees in Europe with the opening of its campus in Brussels, Belgium.
Due to its location in the unofficial capital of Europe, home to the European Union and NATO, the school placed a strong emphasis on international business, and the student body comprised a diverse range of nationalities and cultures.  Participants typically had several years of work experience and were often employed by one of the many multinational corporations and government organizations located in the Benelux region. Classes were held throughout the day or during weekday evenings allowing students to earn a graduate degree within 18–24 months while working full-time.

Classes were conducted in English with fewer than 25 students.

Boston University in Brussels counts more than 300'000 University alumni.

The institution celebrated its 40 years existence on April, the 20th 2012. Boston University Brussels closed its doors in early 2014.

Graduate programs
Boston University Brussels offered several international business programs with classes taught in English following the business education style of the U.S. main campus.

Graduate Degrees
Master of Science in Leadership (MSL)
Master of Arts in International Relations (MAIR)

Graduate Diploma
Graduate Diploma in Finance

Graduate Certificates
Graduate Certificate in Human Resources
Graduate Certificate in International Relations
Graduate Certificate in Management
Graduate Certificate in Marketing
Graduate Certificate in Project Management
Graduate Certificate in Applied Sustainability

Campus
The Boston University Brussels campus was situated on Boulevard du Triomphe / Triomflaan opposite the Université Libre de Bruxelles La Plaine campus.

See also
Boston University
Boston University Graduate School of Management
Boston University Metropolitan College
List of business schools in Europe
MBA

References

External links
Boston University Brussels
Boston University
Boston University Metropolitan College
Boston University Graduate School of Management
MBA4Success

Boston University
Business schools in Belgium
Educational institutions established in 1972
Educational institutions disestablished in 2014
1972 establishments in Belgium
2014 disestablishments in Belgium